The United States Basketball Writers Association (USBWA) was founded in 1956 by National Collegiate Athletic Association director Walter Byers to serve the interests of journalists who cover college basketball.

Scholarships
The USBWA annually awards college scholarships to students pursuing careers in sports journalism and to children of USBWA members.

Awards
The USBWA annually selects a player of the year and All-America teams for both men and women in college basketball. The USBWA men's player of the year award, called the Oscar Robertson Trophy, was first established in 1959 and is considered to be the nation's oldest such award in college basketball.

The USBWA also selects a national coach of the year for men and women, with the men's award named after coach Henry Iba.

The USBWA also chooses a USBWA National Freshman of the Year in men's and women's basketball.

In addition, the USBWA presents a number of other awards:
 Two Most Courageous Awards—one for men's basketball, and the other for women's basketball. Each is presented to a player, coach, official, or other individual connected with college basketball who demonstrates extraordinary courage in life. The women's version has been officially known as the Pat Summitt Most Courageous Award, named after the legendary Tennessee coach, since 2012. Effective with the 2021 awards, the men's version is officially the Perry Wallace Most Courageous Award, named after the Vanderbilt player who was the first African American to play that sport in the Southeastern Conference.
 The Katha Quinn award, in honor of the former Sports Information Director at St. John's University, to individuals who have excelled servicing the media or provide an inspiration to sports writers.

USBWA also divides the country into nine districts, naming for each a Player of the Year, Coach of the Year, and an All-District Team.

Hall of fame

The USBWA also honors past and current members for career achievements with the USBWA Hall of Fame.

See also
Pro Basketball Writers Association
National Collegiate Baseball Writers Association
Baseball Writers' Association of America
Football Writers Association of America (college)
Pro Football Writers Association
Professional Hockey Writers Association
National Sports Media Association

Notes

External
Official website

College basketball mass media in the United States
American sports journalism organizations
Journalism-related professional associations
Sports organizations established in 1956
Organizations based in Missouri